Elections to South Hams District Council took place on 2 May 2019, the same day as other United Kingdom local elections. All 20 wards were up for election, each with either 1, 2 or 3 councillors to be elected. The Conservative Party retained overall control of the council, but with their majority reduced to just 1 seat.

Summary

Election result

|-

Ward elections

Allington & Strete

Bickleigh & Cornwood

Blackawton & Stoke Fleming Ward

Charterlands

Dartington & Staverton

Dartmouth & East Dart (3)

Ermington & Ugborough

Ivybridge East (2)

Ivybridge West (2)

 Cllr. David William May died in December 2020, a by-election will be held in May 2021.

Kingsbridge

Loddiswell & Aveton Gifford

Marldon & Littlehempston

Newton & Yealmpton

Salcombe and Thurlestone

South Brent (2)

Stokenham

Totnes (3)

Wembury and Brixton (2)

West Dart

Woolwell

By-elections

Ivybridge West

References

2019 English local elections
May 2019 events in the United Kingdom
2019
2010s in Devon